Strata Marketing Inc. is a Chicago, Illinois-based software company involved in connecting media buyers and sellers. It is part of FreeWheel, which is a division of Comcast. As of 2010, it processes about $50 billion worth of media buys annually.

History
The company that became Strata was founded in 1983 by Roger Skolnik, PhD, an adjunct professor at the University of Illinois at Chicago.  Skolnik had been national program director for Westinghouse Broadcasting (Group W), based at WIND (AM) Chicago, before moving to WRIF Detroit and ABC-owned WDAI (now WLS-FM) in Chicago. These experiences led him to develop methods for analyzing radio audience information and making it available for both sales and programming. To develop and market software tools for these methods he launched Media Service Concepts. Skolnik's first MSC product was Radio RECALL, programmed by Kevin Killion (whose Stone House Systems, Inc. later created the TView television planning system). Renamed as Strata Marketing, the company originally developed tools for radio stations to use in interpreting and understanding Arbitron radio surveys. Skolnik continued to guide Strata until his death in 1994.

Strata Marketing Inc. was acquired by Comcast in 2005. Strata purchased the custom-development company Spot Buy Spot (SBS) in 2007.

Software 
For agency clients, Strata provides a suite of tools for planning, buying, stewardship, optimization and billing across all forms of media, including TV, cable, radio, print, digital and outdoor.

References

External links 
Strata (official site)

Companies based in Chicago
Companies established in 1983
Software companies based in Illinois
Defunct software companies of the United States